= Sanford Steever =

American linguist

Sanford Barringer Steever (fl. 2000) is an American linguist specializing in Dravidian languages.

== Selected publications ==
- 1988 The Serial Verb Formation in the Dravidian Languages. (MLBD series in linguistics, 4) Delhi: Motilal Banarsidass.
- 1993 Synthesis to Analysis. New York: Oxford University Press.
- 1998 The Dravidian Languages (Routledge Language Family Descriptions) London: Routledge.
- 2005 The Tamil auxiliary verb system. London: Routledge.
